Abdullah Qureshi may refer to:
 Abdullah Qureshi (activist)
 Abdullah Qureshi (singer)
 Abdullah Qureshi (artist)